Elixhausen is a municipality in the district of Salzburg-Umgebung in the state of Salzburg in Austria.

Geography
Elixhausen lies in the Flachgau about 10 km northeast of the city of Salzburg. Neighboring municipalities are Bergheim, Anthering, Seekirchen, and Hallwang. The municipality is divided into five subdivisions: Ursprung, Moosham (also Moßham), Sachsenheim, Auberg, and Katzmoos.

References

Cities and towns in Salzburg-Umgebung District